Ivana Bašić may refer to:

 Ivana Bašić (actress) (born 1976), Croatian actress
 Ivana Bašić (artist) (born 1986), Serbian artist